Gary "Razor" Blades (born 16 November 1980) is an English professional darts player from Lincoln, who competes in the Professional Darts Corporation events.

Career
Blades has played in the UK Open four times. He lost 4–3 in the 1st Round to Gary Flynn in 2005. In 2007, he beat Justin Henshaw 8–6 in the preliminary round, before losing 8–6 to Simon Craven in the 1st Round. In 2020, he lost 6–1 to Wayne Jones in the 1st round. In 2021 he beat Dom Taylor in Round 2 6-0, but then lost 6-3 to Andy Hamilton in the 3rd round.

After returning to the circuit in 2019 without a great deal of success, Blades entered Q-School on 16 January 2020 and won his Tour Card on the first day by beating Tony Newell 5–1 in the final round. He will play on the PDC ProTour in 2020 and 2021.

So far in 2020 he has had moderate success, making the last 32 twice in the first 8 PDC Players Championship events, beating Darren Webster and Scott Waites among others.

References

External links

1980 births
Living people
Professional Darts Corporation former tour card holders
English darts players
Sportspeople from Lincoln, England
People from Lincoln, England